HISTORY 

Before the arrival of the Europeans, Africans drank only fermented beverages with a very low alcoholic content. Palm and raffia wine contain Vitamin C and have about 4 per cent alcohol; millet or maize beer average around 3.5% alcohol and also contain protids and Vitamin B12.

Alcoholism was a "gift" presented to Africa by Europe. The situation became far more serious when stills were introduced in Dahomey in 1922 by Sodabi. Palm alcohol is still known by the name of its popularizer, who brought stills from France as yet another of the benefits of the first world war. From then on Africans distilled maize and manioc beer in the Cameroons, banana beer in Runanda - Urundi(now Rwanda and Burundi) and even sugar cane. 

It is the West African equivalent to Tequila (Mexico), Raki (Eastern Europe), Vodka (Eastern Europe) but Sodabi has yet to be fully commercialised and promoted in the west.

Quality of the drink can vary widely based on the producer, as there is often little to no oversight on the production methods and final chemical content. According to French authorities, this is why the drink was banned throughout the colonial period. Colonial authorities were also concerned that consumption of the drink would hamper imports of European liquors.
It is known by many names: koutoukou in Ivory Coast, Akpeteshie in Ghana or Ogogoro in Nigeria.

It is primarily drank neat in shot format but locals often keep a bottle of Sodabi with Herbs and Spices added into the Bottle to that the flavour  , potency benefits can be fully released. It is drank for ceremonies, food, every day drinking to any occasion.

In Africa a litre of Sodabi often retails for between 2-3 dollars.

Commercial production
Today, several companies have started large scale production of the drink for export to other parts of the world.

References

Beninese cuisine